Cal McCombs (born August 4, 1945) is a former American football player and coach.  He was the 29th head football coach for the Virginia Military Institute (VMI) in Lexington, Virginia, serving for seven seasons, from 1999 to 2005, compiling a record of 19–60. He lives in Isle of Palms, South Carolina with his wife Lynne.

A native of Belton, South Carolina, McCombs is a 1967 graduate of The Citadel, where he earned five varsity letters in football and track. As a defensive back in football, he was an All-Southern Conference and All-State selection.  McCombs was inducted into The Citadel Athletic Hall of Fame in 1988.

McCombs was the secondary coach at The Citadel from 1971 to 1983 under head coaches Red Parker, Bobby Ross, and Art Baker and also coached track for two years.  He next served as secondary coach and defensive coordinator at the United States Air Force Academy before being named head football coach at VMI in 1998. He was a scout with the Denver Broncos for five years after leaving college coaching. In 2015, he served as a coach in the Medal of Honor Bowl played at The Citadels Johnson Hagood Stadium

Head coaching record

Football

References

1945 births
Living people
American football defensive backs
Air Force Falcons football coaches
Denver Broncos scouts
The Citadel Bulldogs football coaches
The Citadel Bulldogs football players
The Citadel Bulldogs track and field coaches
The Citadel Bulldogs men's track and field athletes
VMI Keydets football coaches
People from Charleston County, South Carolina